James Jay Coogan (January 16, 1846 – October 24, 1915) was the borough president of Manhattan, New York from 1899 to 1901, and a successful merchant and real estate manager.

Biography
Coogan was born on January 16, 1846, in Manhattan, New York City.

Coogan started out as an upholsterer, and opened a furniture store on the Bowery. Through his dealings with furniture laborers, he became known as a friend of the working class, and eventually became friendly with Richard Croker, one of the leaders of Tammany Hall. He was a graduate of New York University School of Law. In 1888, he was nominated by the Urban Labor Party for Mayor of New York City, but came in fourth, and Hugh Grant was elected Mayor. He married Harriet Gertrude Lynch, a daughter of William L. Lynch, who had many real estate holdings in Manhattan, including the land on which the Polo Grounds stood. He managed the properties, and is the source of the Coogan's Bluff and Coogan's Hollow names.

He died of heart disease on October 24, 1915, at the Hotel Netherland in Manhattan, New York. He was buried in Calvary Cemetery in Queens, New York City.

References

1846 births
1915 deaths
Manhattan borough presidents
New York University School of Law alumni
Burials at Calvary Cemetery (Queens)